Nochistlán  is a city in the Mexican state of Zacatecas. Nuño Beltrán de Guzmán, on December 3, 1531, hired Cristóbal de Oñate to establish a village in Nochistlán; the village would be named Guadalajara to honor Guzmán for having been born in Guadalajara.
Guadalajara was founded in Nochistlán on January 5, 1532. Its first officials were Cristóbal de Oñate, Sancho Ortiz de Zúñiga, Juan de Albornoz and Miguel de Ibarra. They worked at this project for only 16 months and created the first layout of Guadalajara.

The first news that we have regarding the natives of these lands points to the Tecuexe. These people established settlements around 1000. Later in the 12th century a new group of people moved in, these people were called Caxcan and they were from the valley in Tuitlán, which is now found in the municipality of Villanueva, Zacatecas. The Caxcan established Nochistlán by driving out the Tecuexe by force.

Pueblo Magico
After its 841st anniversary of foundation, Nochistlan was named  or 'magic town' by the Secretary of Tourism (Mexico), Gloria Guevara Manzo. Nochistlán was the fifth town to be named  in the state of Zacatecas. To be nominated for this category, a town must have symbolic attributions, legends, history, significant cultural traditions, and attract tourists. Nochistlán met all of these requirements, which made it eligible to be taken into further consideration.

Music
Nochistlán is known for its traditions as well as its music. It is also often referred to as,  ('the land of musicians'). Nochistlán has been given this nickname because within the town there is always music playing. In fact, Nochistlán's music is one of the main reasons tourists visit so much, aside from the beautiful architecture.

Economic activities
There are 3 main activities that contribute to the economy: agriculture, livestock, and trade.

Transportation
Nochistlán is a very rural place. Transportation is mostly on foot, since everything is within walking distance. Cars, buses, trucks, as well as horses are also used. "Combi vans" and motorcycles are especially popular modes of transport. 

Most Nochistlan inhabitants live by nature. That is, most of their resources are native, making Nochistlan seem somewhat old-fashioned. In recent years the town has been modernizing its way of living.

Traditions

El Papaqui 
This is celebrated every year from January 12 to January 20. El Papaqui is a celebration in which the whole town honors and venerates St. Sebastian. He is a very important figure to those who live or are from Nochistlán. During these eight days, everyone walking in the plaza has their face covered with flour, and people crack colored eggs filled with confetti over others' heads; they also throw oranges. These actions symbolize what was going on during the war between the Natives and Spanish. The flour symbolizes the dirt people would put on their faces to create a more savage look. The fiesta is not solely or predominantly about war; its main objective is to celebrate San Sebastián, the saint most admired in that pueblo.

El Jardín 
Another tradition Nochistlán is famous for is their tradition of every Sunday night. The men of the town form a circle around the plaza while women walk inside the circle. As the women walk inside the circle, if a man finds a woman attractive, in the original tradition, he would give her a Gardenia flower. In most recent, modern tradition, a man puts confetti over the woman's hair, or hollowed- out eggs with confetti inside, instead. A further circle is formed within the inner circle, for children and married women, where they too may go to partake in having the confetti strewn over them. In this way it is made clear to the men which women are married or in a relationship. The Gardenia flower (recent tradition, modern tradition, the colorful confetti) symbolizes the beauty of the woman just as flowers (recent tradition, modern tradition, colors) are beautiful. This tradition originally began to honor women and moreover, to make them feel appreciated by men.

Las Fiestas de Octubre 
The Virgin of Toyahua is a respected figure in Nochistlán because she is known to grant miracles. Most of the residents of Nochistlán pray to her when they are in need of a marvel. Although Nochistlán is small in size, it is big in religion. The feast of October are religious parties to honor St. Francis of Assisi that are celebrated on the second and third weekend of October and the first weekend of November. During these parties, people gather in the plaza to enjoy music from many bands and mariachi groups. Aside from the music, even though the feast is meant for religious events, it's just a big party with very famous bandas come and perform the parties will last from early 8:00 p.m. and sometimes carry on until 5:00 a.m. all the women in the town come together to make food for those participating in the celebration. The festivities also consist of authentic dances, horse races, and rooster tournaments.

International relations

Twin towns – Sister cities
Nochistlán is twinned with:
 Guadalajara, Mexico

Notable people
Jesús González, Business Owner, Financial Planner, Writer and Composer* Bernabé Meléndrez, action film star
 Perro Aguayo, professional wrestler

See also
Municipality of Nochistlán de Mejía

References

Location

Population 67,369

Populated places in Zacatecas
Pueblos Mágicos
Populated places established in 1532